The 1990–91 season was Blackpool F.C.'s 83rd season (80th consecutive) in the Football League. They competed in the 24-team Division Four, then the fourth tier of English football. They finished fifth, missing out on automatic promotion by one point after a final-day defeat at Walsall, and made the play-offs; however, they lost in the final, against Torquay United, in a penalty-shootout after the game finished 2–2 after normal and extra time.

Graham Carr was replaced as manager by his assistant, Billy Ayre, on 30 November. Between 10 November and the end of the season, the club went on to record thirteen consecutive League wins at Bloomfield Road.

Dave Bamber was the club's top scorer, with seventeen league goals.

Results

Table

Play-offs

Semi-finals
Blackpool and Scunthorpe United met in the two-legged semi-finals of the play-offs. The first leg, played at Glanford Park on 19 May, finished 1–1. Three days later, Blackpool won the return leg at Bloomfield Road 2–0, courtesy of a double by David Eyres, and took the tie 3–2 on aggregate. Blackpool's celebration of reaching Wembley since the famous "Matthews Final" thirty-eight years earlier was overshadowed by the news that their former player and manager Stan Mortensen, who scored a hat-trick in that final, had died earlier in the day, at the age of 69.

Final
On 31 May, Blackpool met Torquay United in the final at Wembley. The game finished 2–2 after normal time and extra time. It went to a penalty-shootout, which Torquay won 5–4. Dave Bamber missed the decisive penalty, the second of sudden death, putting it well wide of Gareth Howells' left-hand post.

Player statistics

Appearances

Players used: 24

Goals

Total goals scored: 84 (plus four own-goals)

Notes

References

1990-91
Blackpool